Deogyusan, formerly spelled Togyusan, is a mountain in South Korea.  Its highest peak is 1,614 meters above sea level.

Geography
Deogyusan stands on the border of Jeollabuk-do and Gyeongsangnam-do, covering portions of Muju and Jangsu Counties in Jeollabuk-do and Geochang and Hamyang Counties in Gyeongsangnam-do.

Deogyusan stands on the Baekdudaegan, the mountainous spine of the Korean Peninsula.  It is composed of numerous ridges which rise to various local peaks; the  highest (by which the mountain's elevation is measured) is Hyangjeokbong.

Attractions
Deogyusan is the cornerstone of Deogyusan National Park, established 1975.  The attractions of the park include the Chiryeon Waterfall and Cheoksan mountain fortress. It is also famous for the winter ski resort of Muju.

Animal and plant life
Approximately 250 animal species and 600 plant species are found in the Deogyusan area.  An Amur Leopard was shot on Deogyusan in 1960, a few years before the species disappeared from South Korea. A total of 893 species of plants and 33 species of mammals, 122 species of wild birds, 2,206 species of insects, 9 species of amphibians, 13 species of reptiles and 23 species of freshwater fish were found. The distribution of major flora shows that broad-leaved trees and coniferous trees are distributed in the forest.

See also
List of mountains of Korea
National parks of South Korea
Baekdudaegan
Jirisan

Notes

References

External links 
 Deogyusan National Park
 Endemic Plants Database: Deogyusan
 KNTO profile of Deogyusan
 Tour2Korea profile
  Naver Encyclopedia entry

Mountains of South Gyeongsang Province
Mountains of North Jeolla Province
Muju County
Jangsu County
Geochang County
Hamyang County
Mountains of South Korea
One-thousanders of South Korea
Sobaek Mountains